Edward Victor (1887 – 17 April 1964), born Edward Neuschwander, was a notable stage magician. He was an early member of the Magic Circle and was promoted to the Inner Magic Circle, and for over thirty years was president of the Merlin Magical Society.

Early in his career he also took up shadowgraphy.

History
In 1911, a trial week at St. George's Hall was extended to many months, setting the standard for his professional career. He played top variety theatres in Europe and South Africa and was often seen on television (including a "What's My Line?" appearance which he was quickly recognized).
Victor was the Blackpool Magicians' club's first Honorary Life President.

Published works
 Magic of the Hand (1937)
 More Magic of the Hands (1938)
 Further Magic of the Hands (1946)
 Classic Card Tricks (2004) Dover Publications

References

External links
 
Edward Victor - Magic of the Hands bibliography
Edward Victor - More Magic of the Hands bibliography
Edward Victor - Further Magic of the Hands bibliography
UCSB Special Collections British manuals and guides to magic tricks, conjuring, illusions, and prestidigitation

1887 births
1964 deaths
British magicians
Card magic
Sleight of hand